Sjögren Inlet is an inlet exposed following the retreat of Sjögren Glacier, approximately 17 km long, running east-southeast from the base of Sjögren Glacier, Trinity Peninsula, into Prince Gustav Channel, north of Longing Peninsula.  Entered south of Mount Wild.  The inlet is named in association with Sjögren Glacier.

References
 SCAR Composite Antarctic Gazetteer.

Inlets of Graham Land
Landforms of Trinity Peninsula